County of Clinton may refer to:

Australia
 County of Clinton, Queensland

United States

 Clinton County